Schuylkill Institute of Business and Technology (SIBT) was a private technical college located in Pottsville, Pennsylvania, United States.

The school was founded in 1998, and was sold to MC Education, Inc. in 2000.

In 2006, it was announced that SIBT would be closing at the end of the 2007 year.

References

External links
Schuylkill Institute of Business and Technology

Pottsville, Pennsylvania
Universities and colleges in Schuylkill County, Pennsylvania
Defunct private universities and colleges in Pennsylvania
Educational institutions established in 1998
1998 establishments in Pennsylvania